Monomethylhydrazine (mono-methyl hydrazine, MMH) is a highly toxic, volatile hydrazine derivative with the chemical formula . It is used as a rocket propellant in bipropellant rocket engines because it is hypergolic with various oxidizers such as nitrogen tetroxide and nitric acid. As a propellant, it is described in specification MIL-PRF-27404.

MMH is a hydrazine derivative that was once used in the orbital maneuvering system (OMS) and reaction control system (RCS) engines of NASA's Space Shuttle, which used MMH and MON-3 (a mixture of nitrogen tetroxide with approximately 3% nitric oxide). This chemical is toxic and carcinogenic, but it is easily stored in orbit, providing moderate performance for very low fuel tank system weight. MMH and its chemical relative unsymmetrical dimethylhydrazine (UDMH) have a key advantage that they are stable enough to be used in regeneratively cooled rocket engines. The European Space Agency (ESA) has attempted to seek new options in terms of bipropellant rocket combinations to avoid using deadly chemicals such as MMH and its relatives.

MMH is believed to be the main cause of the toxicity of mushrooms of genus Gyromitra, especially the false morel (Gyromitra esculenta). In these cases, MMH is formed by the hydrolysis of gyromitrin.

Monomethylhydrazine is considered to be a possible occupational carcinogen, and the occupational exposure limits to MMH are set at protective levels to account for the possible carcinogenicity.

A known use of MMH is in the synthesis of suritozole.

MMH is also assumed to be the active methylating agent in the drug Temozolomide.

References

External links

Rocket fuels
Mycotoxins
Hydrazines
Monoamine oxidase inhibitors
Vitamin B6 antagonists
Organic compounds with 1 carbon atom